The Bel Air Handicap was a Thoroughbred horse race run in mid July at Hollywood Park Racetrack in Inglewood, California. Open to horses age three and older, it was contested on dirt at a distance of a mile and a sixteenth. In its final year it was a Grade III event  offering a purse of U.S.$$100,000.

First run in 1939, the Bel Air Handicap was not run again until 1968. From 1980 through 1982 there was no race run.

In 1997, winner Crafty Friend equaled the Hollywood Park track record for  a mile and a sixteenth with a time of 1:40 flat.

Winners

Earlier winners
1994 - Region
1993 - Marquetry
1992 - Renegotiable 
1991 - Twilight Agenda
1990 - Prospectors Gamble
1989 - Rahy
1988 - Cutlass Reality
1987 - Judge Angelucci
1986 - Super Diamond
1985 - My Habitony
1984 - Bid Us
1983 - Poley
1979 - Sirlad
1978 - Vigors
1977 - Ancient Title
1976 - Riot In Paris
1975 - Stardust Mel
1974 - Finalista
1973 - Tri Jet
1972 - Dating
1971 - What Goes On
1970 - Summer Sorrow
1969 - Boughs O' Holly
1968 - Nevada Marga
1939 - Leading Article

References
June 15, 1939 Los Angeles Times article on the Bel Air Handicap
July 17, 1989 Los Angeles Times article titled "Bel Air Handicap Rahy Flirts With World Record, Settles for Win"
July 8, 2001 Los Angeles Times article on the Bel Air Handicap

Discontinued horse races
Horse races in California
Hollywood Park Racetrack